Vinyali is a dish of pork and spices with influences from Kerala in Southern India and Malayalees in Malaysia. It is generally spicy, because much chili and ginger is used.

Sometimes confused with a vindaloo.

See also

 List of pork dishes

References

Kerala cuisine
Pork dishes
Indian cuisine outside India